Abdoulaye Diallo (born 27 January 1963) is a Senegalese former professional footballer who played as a forward.

References

1963 births
Living people
Senegalese footballers
Association football forwards
Senegal international footballers
Olympique de Marseille players
SC Bastia players
Ligue 1 players
Ligue 2 players
Senegalese emigrants to France